The false monitor or tegú varano (Callopistes flavipunctatus) is a species of lizard in the family Teiidae. It is found in Peru and Ecuador.

References

Callopistes
Reptiles described in 1839
Taxa named by André Marie Constant Duméril
Taxa named by Gabriel Bibron